{{Infobox television
| image          = Scoop (1987 film - VHS cover).jpg
| image_size     =
| caption        = DVD cover
| genre          =
| director       = Gavin Millar
| executive_producer = Nick ElliottPatrick Garland
| producer       = Sue Birtwistle
| screenplay     = William Boyd
| based_on       = Scoop  by Evelyn Waugh
| narrated       =
| starring       = Denholm ElliottMichael HordernHerbert Lom
| location       = LondonMorocco
| music          = Stanley Myers
| cinematography = Roger Pratt
| editor         = Derek Bain
| company        = London Weekend Television
| distributor    = ITV - Independent Television
| network        =
| picture_format = Color
| audio_format   = Mono
| released       = 
| runtime        = 120 minutes
| country        = United Kingdom
| language       = English
| budget         =
}}Scoop is a 1987 television film directed by Gavin Millar, adapted by William Boyd from the 1938 satirical novel Scoop by Evelyn Waugh. It was produced by Sue Birtwistle with executive producers Nick Elliott and Patrick Garland. Original music was made by Stanley Myers. The story is  about a reporter sent to the fictional African state of Ishmaelia by accident.

Plot
In a case of mistaken identity, a naive young columnist for The Daily Beast is sent to cover a war in Ishmaelia. A confused editor, Mr. Salter (Denholm Elliott), acting on the orders of his much feared 'boss', Lord Copper (Donald Pleasence), tells William Boot (Michael Maloney) to cover the ongoing war as the correspondent for the Beast. Boot normally writes about British country life, but is too timid, and worried about losing his job for good, to say otherwise when he is ordered overseas.

Boot is soon up to his neck in intrigue. All the foreign journalists are confined to the capital of Ishmaelia, and they are not allowed to leave unless permission has been given by the Minister of Propaganda. The journalists stick together, drinking and trying to pass time, but they watch each other jealously for signs that someone may have a story to send home. However, Lord Hitchcock, the correspondent for the Daily Brute'', is noticeably absent, and this sends the reporters on an insane quest into the desert in the hope of finding the sought-after 'scoop'.

The story is full of bizarre characters: an insane Swedish diplomat who goes berserk when he drinks too much absinthe, the mysterious Mr. Baldwin (Herbert Lom), and a German woman who claims she somehow or other lost her husband. The hapless William Boot appears to be completely out of his depth in the middle of all this chaos and confusion.

Cast 
Denholm Elliott as Mr. Salter
Michael Hordern as Uncle Theodore
Herbert Lom as Mr. Baldwin
Nicola Pagett as Julia Stitch
Donald Pleasence as Lord Copper
Renée Soutendijk as Kätchen
Michael Maloney as William Boot
Sverre Anker Ousdal as Erik Olafsen
Jack Shepherd as Corker

References

External links

1987 television films
1987 films
Films based on British novels
Films based on works by Evelyn Waugh
Films about war correspondents
Films about journalists
1987 comedy films
Films set in Africa
Films directed by Gavin Millar
Films with screenplays by William Boyd (writer)
Films scored by Stanley Myers
1980s English-language films
1980s British films
British comedy television films